Nguyễn Văn Hùng (born 5 May 1980) is a Vietnamese martial artist, and professional basketball player for the Thang Long Warriors of the Vietnam Basketball Association (VBA) and the Saigon Heat of the ASEAN Basketball League (ABL). He is a three-time gold medalist in Taekwondo at the Southeast Asian Games. He also represented his country at the 2008 Beijing Olympics in taekwondo. For his accomplishments in sport, his government granted him the Honourable First Class Labour Order in January 2006.

Văn Hùng was a member of the Vietnam national basketball team that competed in the 2017 SEABA Championship.

References

External links
 
 

Vietnamese male taekwondo practitioners
Taekwondo practitioners at the 2004 Summer Olympics
Taekwondo practitioners at the 2008 Summer Olympics
Olympic taekwondo practitioners of Vietnam
Living people
1980 births
People from Thanh Hóa province
Asian Games medalists in taekwondo
Taekwondo practitioners at the 1998 Asian Games
Taekwondo practitioners at the 2002 Asian Games
Asian Games silver medalists for Vietnam
Asian Games bronze medalists for Vietnam
Medalists at the 1998 Asian Games
Medalists at the 2002 Asian Games
Vietnamese basketball players
Saigon Heat players
Centers (basketball)
Southeast Asian Games gold medalists for Vietnam
Southeast Asian Games medalists in taekwondo
Competitors at the 2005 Southeast Asian Games
Competitors at the 2017 Southeast Asian Games
Asian Taekwondo Championships medalists
21st-century Vietnamese people